The City of Lakewood is the home rule municipality that is the most populous municipality in Jefferson County, Colorado, United States. The city population was 155,984 at the 2020 U.S. Census, making Lakewood the fifth most populous city in Colorado and the 167th most populous city in the United States. Lying immediately west of Denver, Lakewood is a principal city of the Denver–Aurora–Lakewood, CO Metropolitan Statistical Area and a major city of the Front Range Urban Corridor.

History
The urban and suburban development of the community known as Lakewood was started in 1889 by Charles Welch and W.A.H. Loveland, who platted a 13-block area along Colfax Avenue west of Denver in eastern Jefferson County. Loveland, the former president of the Colorado Central Railroad, retired to the new community of Lakewood after many years of living in Golden.

Until 1969, the area known as Lakewood had no municipal government, relying instead on several water districts, several fire districts, and the government of Jefferson County. Lakewood was a community with policing provided by the Jefferson County Sheriff, several volunteer-staffed fire districts, and some neighborhoods without street lights or sidewalks. However, the community had already existed for about 80 years.

The City of Lakewood was incorporated in 1969 as Jefferson City. Soon after, an election was held and the city's name was changed to Lakewood, due to an overwhelming dislike of "Jefferson City" and the belief that it would be confused with existing communities in Colorado and Missouri. At the time of incorporation, the city population was already over 90,000.

Lakewood never had a traditional downtown area. West Colfax Avenue served the metropolitan area as U.S. Route 40 and the main route joining Denver with the Rocky Mountains.  As such, Colfax from Harlan west to Kipling and beyond had mostly commercial establishments. In addition to the Jewish Consumptives' Relief Society (JCRS) for tuberculosis patients, the small, frame Methodist Church, and telephone exchange, by the 1950s grocery and drug stores, gas stations, restaurants and taverns, several motels, branch banks, a movie theater, a roller rink, a bowling alley, and used car lots emerged there. Several multiple-business "shopping centers" developed followed by much larger centers at JCRS and Westland. The Villa Italia Mall on West Alameda Avenue, 20 blocks south of Colfax, reflected the southward expansion of the Lakewood settlement and housed a larger concentration of retail space. As the mall went into decline, the Lakewood City Council developed a plan to demolish the Villa Italia Mall and replace it with a new development called Belmar.

In 2011, Lakewood was named an All-America City for the first time.

December 2021 rampage
On December 27, 2021, a Denver gunman killed three Denver residents and two Lakewood residents before being killed by seriously wounded Lakewood Police Agent Ashley Ferris.

Geography

Lakewood lies in the Colorado Piedmont on the western edge of the Great Plains just east of the Front Range of the southern Rocky Mountains.

The city is located in the watershed of the South Platte River, and several small tributaries of the river flow generally east through it. From north to south, these include Lakewood Gulch, Weir Gulch, Sanderson Gulch, and Bear Creek. Two tributaries of Lakewood Gulch, Dry Gulch, and McIntyre Gulch flow east through the northern part of the city. Turkey Creek, a tributary of Bear Creek, flows northeast through the far southwestern part of the city. In addition, Lena Gulch, a tributary of Clear Creek to the north, flows east then north through the extreme northwestern part of the city.

Several small lakes and reservoirs are in Lakewood. The Soda Lakes lie in the extreme southwestern part of the city. East of them lies Bear Creek Lake, a reservoir fed by Bear Creek and Turkey Creek. Clustered near each other in central Lakewood are Main Reservoir, East Reservoir, Smith Reservoir, Kendrick Lake, and Cottonwood Lake. Northeast of them lies Kountze Lake. In the northwestern part of the city, Lena Gulch both feeds and drains Maple Grove Reservoir. In the extreme southern part of the city lies Bowles Reservoir No. 1 and, just outside the city limits to the reservoir's northeast, Marston Lake.

At the 2020 United States Census, the town had a total area of  including  of water.

As a suburb of Denver, Lakewood is part of both the greater Denver metropolitan area and the Front Range Urban Corridor. It borders other communities on all sides, including Wheat Ridge to the north, Edgewater to the northeast, Denver to the east and southeast, Dakota Ridge to the south, Morrison to the southwest, and Golden, West Pleasant View, East Pleasant View, and Applewood to the northwest.

Climate

According to the Köppen Climate Classification system, Lakewood has a cold semiarid climate, abbreviated "Bsk" on climate maps.

Demographics

As of the 2010 census,  142,980 people, 61,986 households, and 35,882 families were residing in the city. Its 65,758 housing units averaged 1,533.5 per square mile (591.9/km). The racial makeup of the city was 82.9% White, 3.1% Asian, 1.6% Black, 1.4% American Indian, 0.1% Pacific Islander, 7.7% from other races, and 3.3% from two or more races. Hispanics and Latinos of any race were 22.0% of the population.

Of the 61,986 households, 26.8% had children under the age of 18 living with them, 41.1% were married couples living together, 5.0% had a male householder with no wife present, 11.9% had a female householder with no husband present, and 42.1% were not families. About 33.5% of all households were made up of individuals, and 10.2% had someone living alone who was 65 years of age or older. The average household size was 2.27, and the average family size was 2.92.

The distribution of the population by age was 20.8% under the age of 18, 9.6% from 18 to 24, 27.1% from 25 to 44, 28.0% from 45 to 64, and 14.5% who were 65 years of age or older. The median age was 39.2 years. The gender makeup of the city was 48.9% male and 51.1% female.

The median income for a household in the city was $52,960, and for a family was $66,947. Males had a median income of $46,907 versus $41,476 for females. The city's per capita income was $30,027. About 9.1% of families and 11.7% of the population were below the poverty line, including 20.3% of those under age 18 and 6.1% of those age 65 or over.

Economy
Lakewood's economy is diverse, while the largest employers are the government. Companies based in Lakewood include Einstein Bros. Bagels, FirstBank, and The Integer Group.

As of 2013, 67.3% of the population over the age of 16 was in the labor force. 0.1% were in the armed forces, and 67.3% were in the civilian labor force with 61.1% employed and 6.2% unemployed. The occupational composition of the employed civilian labor force was 38.6% in management, business, science, and arts; 25.9% in sales and office occupations; 16.9% in service occupations; 9.9% in production, transportation, and material moving; and 8.7% in natural resources, construction, and maintenance. The three industries employing the largest percentages of the working civilian labor force were educational services, health care, and social assistance (18.4%); professional, scientific, and management, and administrative and waste management services (13.8%); and retail trade (11.9%).

The cost of living index in Lakewood, compared to a U.S. average of 100, is 107.4. As of 2013, the median home value in the city was $238,500, the median selected monthly owner cost was $1,546 for housing units with a mortgage and $442 for those without, and the median gross rent was $940.

Top employers
According to the city's 2017 annual report, the top employers in the city are:

Government

Lakewood maintains a council-manager form of government. Citizens elect a city council consisting of the mayor, who is elected at-large, and 10 city council members, 2 from each of the city's five geographical wards. The mayor and the council members assert the policies for the operation of the city government.  The current City Manager, Kathleen Hodgson, is the longest-tenured City Manager in the State of Colorado.

The current mayor is Adam Paul. The council members representing Ward 1 are Jeslin Shahrezaei and Charley Able; Sophia Mayott-Guerrero and Sharon Vincent represent Ward 2; Anita Springsteen and Rebekah Stewart represent Ward 3; Rich Olver and Barb Franks represent Ward 4; and Ward 5 is represented by Wendi Strom and Mary Janssen.

The City of Lakewood falls into Colorado House District 26, parts of House District 24, and House District 23. Lakewood is represented in the state house by Reps. Chris Kennedy, Kerry Tipper, and Monica Duran.

Education
Lakewood is within Jefferson County School District R-1.

Lakewood also houses Lakewood High School, Green Mountain High School, Bear Creek High School, Brady Exploration High School, Alameda International High School, and International Baccalaureate schools in Jefferson County, as well as the private Colorado Academy, and Accelerated Prep. Lakewood is also home to Colorado Christian University and Colorado School of Trades.

The town is served by the Jefferson County Public Library.

Transportation
Transportation within the city, and to other areas in the metropolitan area, is provided by RTD. RTD's Light Rail W line runs directly through Lakewood. Intercity transportation is provided by Bustang. Lakewood is along Bustang's West Line, which connects Denver to Grand Junction.

Points of interest
Landmarks and historical points of interest include:

 The old Villa Italia Mall has been replaced by Belmar, a new town center with a mix of retail, residential, cultural, and public space.
 The Laboratory of Art and Ideas at Belmar was located in Belmar until May 2009, and that location is now occupied by:
 the Colorado Campus of the Ohio Center for Broadcasting, a private trade school for the radio and television industry.
 Belmar has a designated Arts District that houses several artist studios and several gallery spaces, and
 "Working with Artists",  a nonprofit fine-art photography school. 
 Casa Bonita, a local Mexican restaurant in Lakewood, is where a South Park episode took place.
 Lakewood Cultural Center features a theater, gallery space, and art classrooms.
 Heritage Lakewood Belmar Park is a 20th-century museum and festival grounds, with several historic buildings, and is located near Kountze Lake; the site formerly housed the Belmar family mansion.
 Reed Art & Imaging at 8000 West Colfax Avenue is housed in what was originally the Lakewood movie theater, dating from the early 1950s.
 At William Fredrick Hayden Park in the foothills of Green Mountain, the Colorado National Guard previously used the north side for artillery practice. Since 2012 the Department of Defense Military Munitions Response Program has financed investigations to identify unexploded ordnance there.
 Lakewood has a shopping mall called Colorado Mills, which is near I‑70 and West Colfax Avenue.
 The 40 West Arts District includes a bike and "walking art experience" along the light rail line.

Notable people

Notable individuals who were born in or have lived in Lakewood include
 Sol Katz, geospatial software pioneer
 Chris Broderick, Megadeth guitarist
 Steve Williams, professional wrestler "Dr. Death" 
 May Bonfils Stanton, Colorado heiress and philanthropist

Sister cities
Lakewood has four sister cities, as designated by Sister Cities International:
  Chester, Cheshire, United Kingdom
  Portsmouth, Hampshire, United Kingdom, also a Friendship City
  Stade, Lower Saxony, Germany
  Sutherland Shire, Sydney, New South Wales, Australia

See also

Colorado
Bibliography of Colorado
Index of Colorado-related articles
Outline of Colorado
List of places in Colorado
List of counties in Colorado
List of municipalities in Colorado
Colorado metropolitan areas
Front Range Urban Corridor
North Central Colorado Urban Area
Denver-Aurora, CO Combined Statistical Area
Denver-Aurora-Lakewood, CO Metropolitan Statistical Area

Footnotes

References

External links

 
 CDOT map of the City of Lakewood
 Lakewood Heritage Center
 Accelerated Prep Website

 
Populated places established in 1889
Cities in Colorado
Cities in Jefferson County, Colorado